The Humboldt Bank Building is a 19-floor office building at 785 Market Street and Fourth Street in San Francisco, California. It was created by the Humboldt Savings Bank, with construction beginning in 1905. However, the 1906 San Francisco earthquake destroyed its initial construction phase. A new building was completed in 1908. The building consists granite, marble, and terra cotta tile facing over reinforced concrete and steel.

See also
 
 San Francisco's tallest buildings

References

External links
 

Skyscraper office buildings in San Francisco
Financial District, San Francisco
Market Street (San Francisco)
Office buildings completed in 1908
Buildings and structures destroyed in the 1906 San Francisco earthquake
1900s architecture in the United States
Beaux-Arts architecture in California
1908 establishments in California